No Trace may refer to: 

No Trace (1950 film), a British crime film directed by John Gilling
No Trace (2021 film), a Canadian drama film directed by Simon Lavoie
No Trace Camping, a Canadian film and television studio